Ramsau is a German municipality in the Bavarian Alps with a population of around 1,800. It is a district  located in the  Berchtesgadener Land in Bavaria, close to the border with Austria, 35 km south of Salzburg and 150 km south-east of Munich. It is situated north of the Berchtesgaden National Park.

Notable sights of Ramsau include the third highest mountain in Germany called the Watzmann, Lake Hintersee and the village's church.

Gallery

Notable people

 Wolfgang Bartels
 Hans Brandner
 Hermann Buhl
 Mirko Eichhorn
 
 Franz Graßl
 Hartmut Graßl
 Judith Graßl
 
 Matej Juhart
 
 Manuel Machata
 Anton Palzer
 Franz Pöschl

References

Berchtesgadener Land
Spa towns in Germany